Gabriel Pereira Minas (born 5 March 1998), commonly known as Gabriel Capixaba, is a Brazilian footballer who plays for está sem clube as a forward.

Career statistics

Club

References

1998 births
Living people
Brazilian footballers
Brazilian expatriate footballers
Association football forwards
2. Liga (Slovakia) players
Fluminense FC players
FC ŠTK 1914 Šamorín players
Brazilian expatriate sportspeople in Slovakia
Expatriate footballers in Slovakia